Lillian Lewis may refer to:

 Lillian Lewis (actress) (1852–1899), American actress
 Lillian A. Lewis (b. 1861), American journalist
 Lillian Lewis Batchelor (1907–1977), American librarian
 Lillian Miles Lewis (1939–2012), American political adviser and wife of John Lewis